Raja Sen (born 10 November 1955) is an Indian film and television director and the winner of three National Film Awards from Kolkata, West Bengal, India. He is the father of actress Rimi Sen.

Career
Raja Sen first received recognition with Subarnalata (1997), a
teleserial, he followed it up with Adarsha Hindu Hotel, Arogyo Niketan, few episodes of Desh Amaar Desh are some of the notables of the Bengali television arena.

He has also documented the real life paradigm of the living legends of
Bengal's World of Art & Culture, namely, Suchitra Mitra, Tapan Sinha, Sombhu Mitra, Subhas Mukhopadhyay.

Personal life
Raja Sen is married to Papiya Sen, has two daughters, Romi Sen and Rimi Sen and two granddaughters Mishka and Juana.

Filmography

Feature film
 Damu (1996) - Cast: Raghuvir Yadav, Satya Banerjee, Monoj Mitra, Sabyasachi Chakrabarty, Rimi Sen (Child Artist).
 Atmiyo Swajan (1999) - Cast: Soumitra Chatterjee, Supriya Devi, Dipankar De, Sabyasachi Chakrabarty, Rituparna Sengupta, Shakuntala Barua, Alok Mukherjee, Ashok Mitra, Asit Mukherjee, Chaitali Ghoshal, June Malia, Papiya Sen, Piyush Ganguly, Pradip Chakraborty, Rimi Sen (Child Artist), Tridib Ghosh.
 Chakrabyuhya (2000) - Indrajeet, Chiranjeet, Anjan Srivastava, Rituparna Sen Gupta, Indrani Haldar, Chitra Sen, June Maliya.
 Desh (2002) - Cast: Jaya Bhaduri, Abhishek Bachchan, Sabyasachi Chakravarthy, Subhendu Chatterjee, Gyanesh Mukherjee, Nayana Das, Monu Mukherjee, Kaushik Sen, Rajesh Sharma, Dulal Lahiri.
 Debipaksha (2004) - Cast: Soumitra Chatterjee, Rituparna Sengupta, Satabdi Roy, Koel Mullick.
 Krishnakanter Will (2007) - Cast: Jeet, Soumitra Chatterjee, Swastika Mukherjee.
 Tinmurti (2009) - Cast: Ranjit Mullick, Dipankar Dey, Manoj Mitra, Paoli Dam.
 Laboratory (2010) - Cast: Raveena Tandon (debut in the Bengali film industry), Arpita Chatterjee, Sabyasachi Chakraborty, Ranjit Mullick.
 Moubone Aaj (2011) - Cast: Ranjit Mullick, Manoj Mitra, Dipankar Dey, Rahul, Priyanka and Rachana Banerjee.
 Colonel (2012) - Cast: Chiranjit, Sabyasachi, Kharaj, Saheb, Shakar, Sudip, and Tapas Paul.
 Maya Mridanga (2016) -Cast: Debshankar Haldar, Rituparna Sengupta, Paoli Dam, Gautam Haldar

Documentaries
 Filmmaker for Freedom (a film on Tapan Sinha)
 Subhas Mukhopadhyay
 Suchitra Mitra
 Sambhu Mitra - 3 hours documentation by EZCC
 Jyotirmoyee Devi
 Alkaap - a dying folk culture
 Itihasher Kolkata (5 episodes on the heritage of Kolkata)
 Samaresh Basu  (ICIL)
 Rosogolla - brand ambassador of Bengal (EZCC)
 The Greatest Bengali of The Millennium - (a film on Sheikh Mujibur Rahman, BBC announced the founding father of Bangladesh as the Greatest Bengali of all time voted by Bengalis worldwide.)

TV serials
 Kolkata Kolkata
 Adarsha Hindu Hotel
 Subarnalata
 Samparka
 Arogya Niket
 Anirban
 Anjuman
 Streeash Charitram
 Tarasankarer Chhoto Galpo

Awards
 1993 - Documentary Suchitra Mitra - National Film Award for Best Arts/Cultural Film
 1997 - Debut feature film 'Damu' - National Film Award for Best Children's Film
 1997 - Best Film  - Shiromoni Award
 1997 - Best Audinence Juvenile Award in Dhaka International Film Festival
 1999 - Atmiyo Swajan - National Film Award for Best Film on Family Welfare
 1999 - Cairo International Film Festival

References

External links
 Raja Sen Biography and Filmography Calcuttaweb.com
 

Indian documentary filmmakers
1955 births
Living people
University of Calcutta alumni
Film directors from Kolkata
21st-century Indian film directors
Indian television directors
Bengali film directors
20th-century Indian film directors
Directors who won the Best Children's Film National Film Award
Directors who won the Best Film on Family Welfare National Film Award